The 1938 World Table Tennis Championships women's singles was the 12th edition of the women's singles championship.
Gertrude Pritzi defeated Vlasta Depetrisová in the final by three sets to nil, to win the title.

Results

See also
List of World Table Tennis Championships medalists

References

-
-